James Ford House is a historic home located at Lawrenceville in Tioga County, Pennsylvania. It is a -story brick house built in 1831 in the late Federal style.  Congressman James Ford had this house built for his son.

It was listed on the National Register of Historic Places in 1975.

See also 
 National Register of Historic Places listings in Tioga County, Pennsylvania

References 

Houses on the National Register of Historic Places in Pennsylvania
Federal architecture in Pennsylvania
Houses completed in 1831
Houses in Tioga County, Pennsylvania
National Register of Historic Places in Tioga County, Pennsylvania